Anne Namakau Mutelo is a Namibian diplomat from the Zambezi Region.

Education 
Mutelo completed her primary and secondary education in Zamibia, and in 1977 she completed her high school education at Kalonga Secondary School  in Kabwe.

Mutelo graduated from the University of Fort Hare in South Africa with a bachelor's degree in social Work. She also has a certificate from Graduate Institute in multilateral diplomacy and from the University of Malta and from Diplofoundation she obtained a post graduate diploma in contemporary diplomacy.

Diplomatic career 
Mutelo was an AU and UNECA chairperson as well as the ambassador of the Republic of Namibia to Ethiopia in 2015. In 1991–1995, Mutelo was the desk officer for the Southern African Development Community (SADC). During that period, she attended several SADC summits as well as SADC-EU conferences, from 1995 to 1999. She was in Botswana as Deputy Ambassador at the Namibia High Commission.

References 

Namibian women diplomats
Ambassadors of Namibia to Ethiopia
University of Fort Hare alumni
21st-century diplomats
Living people
Year of birth missing (living people)